MPXpress is a series of diesel-electric passenger train locomotives designed for commuter rail service. The locomotives are built by MotivePower, a subsidiary of Wabtec. To date, MPI has offered five main variants: MP36PH-3S, MP36PH-3C, MP40PH-3C, MP32PH-Q, and MP54AC. However, due to federal emissions standards, the MP54AC is the only locomotive currently for sale in the United States, as it is the only MPXpress locomotive that meets Tier 4 standards.

The MPXpress line of locomotives were the first production passenger locomotives to meet FRA safety regulations regarding crashworthiness and fire safety. The line also meets APTA crashworthiness standards.

Production of the locomotives have kept pace with increasingly stringent emissions regulations from the United States Environmental Protection Agency (EPA). Between 2002 and 2015, the EPA has issued four "tiers" of emissions standards and in each case the MPXpress was the first (and in some cases, only) passenger locomotive to meet the standard.

Numerous public transit agencies in Canada and the United States have ordered MPXpress locomotives for their commuter rail services. GO Transit is currently the largest client for MPI MPXpress locomotives, with 93 in their fleet.

Models

MP36PH-3S

The MP36PH-3S uses a 16-cylinder EMD 645F3B diesel engine as its prime mover, capable of generating 3,600 hp. Head-end power (HEP) is generated by a static inverter that receives its power through connections to the prime mover (hence the "S" (static) designation). Compared to a locomotive with a separate HEP generator, the prime mover must constantly maintain a higher RPM in order to supply power to the passenger cars. The setup is simpler but leads to higher noise levels and higher fuel consumption.

When providing the maximum 500 kW HEP load, maximum traction power is reduced to 2,930 hp since HEP generation diverts some power from the prime mover.

The MP36PH-3S was the first variety of MPXpress locomotive to be built and the launch customer was Metra, a commuter railroad in the Chicago area. Metra ordered 27 of these locomotives in 2001, which were built and delivered between 2003 and 2004. Fourteen were to replace the railroad's aged F40C fleet, while the rest were for fleet expansion. Until 2021, when the 3S variants were converted to 3C's, Metra was the only remaining operator of the MP36PH-3S variant of the MPXpress.

When the locomotives were first delivered, the onboard computer systems proved problematic. At one point in 2004, because Metra had so many MPXpress locomotives out of service, two F40Cs had to be placed back into service for a short time.

Conversion to MP36PH-3C specification 
Starting in 2015, Metra began converting its MP36PH-3S locomotives to the MP36PH-3C specification by removing the static inverter and replacing it with a separate HEP generator. Metra's MP36PH-3C locomotives all have extended radiators to supply the extra cooling for the new Caterpillar generators. Locomotive No. 417 was the first one to be converted and was sent to MPI in Boise. The rest were rebuilt at Metra's 47th Street shops on the South Side of Chicago. As of 2021, all of the MP36PH-3S locomotives have been converted to the MP36PH-3C specification.

MP36PH-3C 

The MP36PH-3C has the same EMD 645F3B prime mover as the MP36PH-3S model, but with a separate head-end power generator, a Caterpillar C-27.

The launch customer for the MP36PH-3C was Caltrain, a commuter railroad in the San Francisco Bay Area. Caltrain ordered 6 of these locomotives in 2003, which were built and delivered that same year. This locomotive has gone on to become the most popular MPXpress variant, with 100 delivered to nine different customers.

MP40PH-3C
 
The MP40PH-3C introduced a new prime mover, the larger 16-cylinder EMD 710G3B series diesel engine, capable of generating 4,000 hp. The MP40PH-3C also uses an EMD alternator and traction motors.

The launch customer for the MP40PH-3C was GO Transit, a commuter railroad in the Toronto area. MotivePower and GE Transportation responded to the request, with MotivePower being selected as the winning bidder. GO Transit placed an order for 27 locomotives in 2006, which were built and delivered between 2007 and 2008.

In 2011, MotivePower upgraded the MP40PH-3C to comply with the EPA's more stringent Tier 3 emissions standard, which was in effect between 2012 and 2014. Three locomotives meeting this standard were built, all delivered to Sounder commuter rail in the Seattle area. Ten additional locomotives for GO Transit are also Tier 3 compliant.

MP32PH-Q

The MP32PH-Q was built from 2013 to 2014 for SunRail. They have similar specifications as new MPXpress locomotives, but are rebuilt and refurbished from units that had previously operated on MARC as GP40WH-2 locomotives. Inside the locomotive, the 3,000 hp EMD 16-645E3C prime mover has been rebuilt and electronics have been upgraded using the same equipment as other MPXpress locomotives, as well as a horsepower upgrade from 3,000 to 3,600. On the exterior, the MP32PH-Q retains the hood unit layout of the former GP40WH-2, but a new four-window MPXpress cab replaces the original cab.

MP54AC

The MP54AC (also known as MP40PHTC-T4AC) is the latest locomotive in the MPXpress family and the only model available for sale in the US. It is designed to both meet the EPA's stringent Tier 4 emissions standard and offer higher performance than the MP40PH-3C. The MP54AC is a genset locomotive, using a pair of Cummins QSK60 60-liter, 16-cylinder engines rated at 2,700 hp each (5,400 hp total) and during periods of low power demand, the locomotive can operate on just one engine to reduce noise pollution and boost fuel efficiency. The 5,400 total horsepower qualifies the MP54AC as the most powerful diesel-electric passenger locomotive in North America, both currently and historically.

Currently, the MP54AC can be built as new or by having existing MPXpress locomotives rebuilt to the standard.

GO Transit was the launch customer for the MP54AC. The first prototype unit was built by converting a MP40PH-3C owned by GO Transit (unit 647). MotivePower removed the EMD prime mover and HEP motor and replaced them with the twin Cummins engines. Heavy modifications were made to the body to accommodate extra air intake and exhaust stacks. Unit 647 was delivered to GO Transit late 2015 and was seen under testing on December 12, 2015.

Initially GO Transit had planned to convert a total of ten MP40PH-3Cs to the new MP54AC standard; it later ordered 16 additional newly built MP54AC locomotives and eventually converted the order for rebuilt units to new builds for a total of 26.

The MP54AC competes with other Tier 4 compliant locomotives, such as the Siemens Charger series and the EMD F125. Both the MP54AC and F125 have struggled to find customers, unlike the Charger series, which has sold more than 350 units including large orders from Amtrak and Via Rail.

Operators

Internal layout

References

External links

MP54AC Brochure and Spec Sheet
MPXpress Commuter Locomotives Brochure and Spec Sheet

MPI locomotives
B-B locomotives
Passenger locomotives
Diesel-electric locomotives of the United States
EPA Tier 2-compliant locomotives of the United States
Standard gauge locomotives of the United States
Standard gauge locomotives of Canada
Diesel-electric locomotives of Canada